(Latin for "reduction to Hitler"), also known as playing the Nazi card, is an attempt to invalidate someone else's argument on the basis that the same idea was promoted or practised by Adolf Hitler or the Nazi Party. Arguments can be termed  if they are fallacious (e.g., arguing that because Hitler abstained from eating meat or was against smoking, anyone else who does so is a Nazi). Contrarily, straightforward arguments critiquing specifically fascist components of Nazism like Führerprinzip are not part of the association fallacy. 

Invented by Leo Strauss in 1953,  takes its name from the term used in logic called  ("reduction to the absurd"). The suggested rationale is one of guilt by association. It is a tactic often used to derail arguments because such comparisons tend to distract and anger the opponent.

Definition 
 is a type of association fallacy. The argument is that a policy leads to—or is the same as—one advocated or implemented by Adolf Hitler or Nazi Germany and so "proves" that the original policy is undesirable.

A comparison to Hitler or Nazism is not a  if it illuminates an argument instead of causing distraction from it. Straightforward comparisons can be used to criticize fascist components of Nazism like führerprinzip. However, one could argue fallaciously that because Hitler abstained from eating meat or was against smoking, anyone else who does so is a Nazi.

History 
The phrase  is first known to have been used in an article written by University of Chicago professor Leo Strauss for Measure: A Critical Journal in spring 1951, although it was made famous in a book by Strauss published in 1953 Natural Right and History, Chapter II:

In following this movement towards its end we shall inevitably reach a point beyond which the scene is darkened by the shadow of Hitler. A view is not refuted by the fact that it happens to have been shared by Hitler.

The phrase was derived from the logical argument termed Reductio ad absurdum.

Limits to classification as a fallacy 
Historian Daniel Goldhagen, who had written about the Holocaust, argues that not all comparisons to Hitler and Nazism are logical fallacies since if they all were, there would be nothing to learn from the events that resulted in the Holocaust. He argues in his book Hitler's Willing Executioners that many people who were complicit or active participants in the Holocaust and subsequently in fascist and neo-Nazi movements have manipulated the historical narrative to escape blame or to deny aspects of the Holocaust. Claims that allegations of antisemitism are reductio ad Hitlerum have also been employed by David Irving, a British Holocaust denier.

In 2000, Thomas Fleming claimed that reductio ad Hitlerum was being used by his opponents against his values:
If Hitler liked neoclassical art, that means that classicism in every form is Nazi; if Hitler wanted to strengthen the German family, that makes the traditional family (and its defenders) Nazi; if Hitler spoke of the "nation" or the "folk", then any invocation of nationality, ethnicity, or even folkishness is Nazi ...

Antecedents 
Although named for Hitler, the logical fallacy existed prior to the Second World War. There were other individuals from history who were used as stand-ins for evil. Author Tom Holland compares the use of Hitler as the standard of evil with earlier invocations of the Devil (such as the phrase 'Deal with the Devil'). During the 18th, 19th and early 20th centuries, the Pharaoh of the Book of Exodus was commonly considered the most villainous person in history. During the years prior to the American Civil War, abolitionists referred to slaveholders as modern-day Pharaohs. After VE Day, Pharaoh continued to appear in the speeches of social reformers like Martin Luther King Jr. Judas Iscariot and Pontius Pilate were also commonly held up as pure evil. However, there was no universal Hitler-like person and different regions and times used different stand-ins. In the years after the American Revolution, King George III was often vilified in the United States. During the American Civil War, some Confederates called Lincoln a "modern Pharaoh".

Invocations 

In 1991, Michael André Bernstein alleged  over a full-page advertisement placed in The New York Times by the Lubavitch community after the Crown Heights riot under the heading "This Year Kristallnacht Took Place on August 19th Right Here in Crown Heights". Henry Schwarzschild, who had witnessed Kristallnacht, wrote to The New York Times that "however ugly were the anti-Semitic slogans and the assaultive behavior of people in the streets [during the Crown Heights riots] ... one thing that clearly did not take place was a Kristallnacht".

The American Conservative accused Jonah Goldberg's book Liberal Fascism of employing the  fallacy:
That Nazism and contemporary liberalism both promote healthy living is as meaningless a finding as that bloody marys and martinis may both be made with gin. In no case does Goldberg uncover anything more ominous than a coincidence.

Since Hitler was against smoking, some have invoked the argument to compare those who are against smoking to Nazis.

See also 
 Godwin's law
 List of fallacies
 Red-baiting (reductio ad Stalinum)

References

External links 
 
 Toying with Hitler and History – slideshow by Der Spiegel
 Mike Huckabee's reductio ad Hitlerum, Lincoln Mitchell, April 7 2013
 
 

1950s neologisms
Dog Latin words and phrases
Ethically disputed political practices
Genetic fallacies
Informal fallacies
Nazi analogies
Relevance fallacies
Adolf Hitler